Bosniaks in Turkey refers to citizens of Turkey who are, or descend from, ethnic Bosniak people, originating in Bosnia and Herzegovina, Sandžak and other former Yugoslav republics.

The Bosniak community in Turkey has its origins predominantly in the exodus of Bosniaks from the Bosnia Eyalet taking place in the 19th and early 20th century as a result of the collapse of the Ottoman Empire's rule in the Balkans. According to estimates commissioned in 2008 by the National Security Council of Turkey (Milli Güvenlik Kurulu) as many as 2,000,000 Turkish citizens are of Bosniak ancestry. Bosniaks mostly live in the Marmara Region which is in other words the north-west of Turkey. The biggest Bosniak community in Turkey is in Istanbul.
Yenibosna ("New Bosnia") is a borough, located on the western part of the Istanbul district of Bahçelievler, bordering with the neighboring district Küçükçekmece. The district saw rapid migration from the former Ottoman Empire after the founding of the Republic of Turkey.
The origin of the borough's name comes from the capital of Bosnia and Herzegovina, Sarajevo. The settlement was initially named Saraybosna, which is the Turkish equivalent of Sarajevo, before it was renamed Yenibosna with the formation of the Republic of Turkey.

There are notable Bosniak communities in İzmir, Karamürsel, Yalova, Bursa and Edirne.

Numbers 

In the census of 1965, those who spoke Bosnian as first language were proportionally most numerous in Kocaeli (1.2%), Sakarya (0.7%), Kırklareli (0.4%) and Izmir (0.2%).

There are currently an estimated 106,000 Turkish citizens identifying as Bosniaks.

Notable people
Seda Bakan, actress (Maternal side)
Bülent Ecevit, politician, served as the Prime Minister of Turkey four times (Maternal side)
Çagatay Ulusoy, actor (Maternal side)
Kıvanç Tatlıtuğ, famed actor (Paternal side, Bosniak and Albanian)
Sedef Avcı, actress (Maternal Side)
Birkan Sokullu, actor (Grandparents)
Furkan Andıç, actor (Maternal side)
Farah Zeynep Abdullah, actress (Maternal side)
Berk Hakman, actor (Bosniak descendant)
Begüm Kütük, actress (Maternal side)
Barış Falay, actor (Maternal side)

See also
Turks in Bosnia and Herzegovina

References

Ethnic groups in Turkey
 
Demographics of Turkey
Bosniak diaspora
European diaspora in Turkey